Akutan may refer to:

Akutan, Alaska
Mount Akutan
Akutan Island

Akutan Zero
A nickname for Minato Aqua, a member of Hololive Production